The Brussels sprout is a member of the Gemmifera cultivar group of cabbages (Brassica oleracea), grown for its edible buds. The leaf vegetables are typically 1.5–4.0 cm (0.6–1.6 in) in diameter and resemble miniature cabbages. The Brussels sprout has long been popular in Brussels, Belgium, from which it gained its name.

Etymology
Although native to the Mediterranean region with other cabbage species, Brussels sprouts first appeared in northern Europe during the 5th century; they were later cultivated in the 13th century near Brussels, Belgium, from which they derived their name. Its group name Gemmifera (or lowercase and italicized gemmifera as a variety name) means  (bud-producing).

Cultivation
Forerunners to modern Brussels sprouts were probably cultivated in Ancient Rome.  Brussels sprouts as they are now known were grown possibly as early as the 13th century in what is now Belgium. The first written reference dates to 1587.  During the 16th century, they enjoyed a popularity in the southern Netherlands that eventually spread throughout the cooler parts of Northern Europe.

Brussels sprouts grow in temperature ranges of 7–24 °C (45–75 °F), with highest yields at 15–18 °C (59–64 °F). Fields are ready for harvest 90 to 180 days after planting. Sprouts may be picked by hand into baskets, in which case several harvests are made of five to 15 sprouts at a time, or by cutting the entire stalk at once for processing, or by mechanical harvester, depending on variety. Harvest season in temperate zones of the northern latitudes is September to March, making Brussels sprouts a traditional winter-stock vegetable. In the home garden, harvest can be delayed as quality does not suffer from freezing. Sprouts are considered to be sweetest after a frost.

Brussels sprouts are a cultivar group of the same species as broccoli, cabbage, collard greens, kale, and kohlrabi; they are cruciferous (they belong to the family Brassicaceae; old name Cruciferae). Many cultivars are available; some are purple in color, such as 'Ruby Crunch' or 'Red Bull'. The purple varieties are hybrids between purple cabbage and regular green Brussels sprouts developed by a Dutch botanist in the 1940s, yielding a variety with some of the red cabbage's purple colors and greater sweetness.

Contemporary Brussels sprouts 
In the 1990s, Dutch scientist Hans van Doorn identified the chemicals that make Brussels sprouts bitter: sinigrin and progoitrin. This enabled Dutch seed companies to cross-breed archived low-bitterness varieties with modern high-yield varieties, over time producing a significant increase in the popularity of the vegetable.

Europe 
In Continental Europe, the largest producers are the Netherlands, at 82,000 metric tons, and Germany, at 10,000 tons. The United Kingdom has production comparable to that of the Netherlands, but its crop is generally not exported.

Mexico
Second to the Netherlands in export volume is Mexico where the climate allows nearly year-round production. The Baja region is the main supplier to the US market, but produce also comes from the Mexicali, San Luis and coastal areas.

North America 
Production of Brussels sprouts in the United States began in the 18th century, when French settlers brought them to Louisiana. The first plantings in California's Central Coast began in the 1920s, with significant production beginning in the 1940s. Currently, several thousand acres are planted in coastal areas of San Mateo, Santa Cruz, and Monterey counties of California, which offer an ideal combination of coastal fog and cool temperatures year-round. The harvest season lasts from June through January.

Most U.S. production is in California, with a smaller percentage of the crop grown in Skagit Valley, Washington, where cool springs, mild summers, and rich soil abounds, and to a lesser degree on Long Island, New York. Total US production is around 32,000 tons, with a value of $27 million.

About 80 to 85% of U.S. production is for the frozen food market, with the remainder for fresh consumption. Once harvested, sprouts last 3–5 weeks under ideal near-freezing conditions before wilting and discoloring, and about half as long at refrigerator temperature. North American varieties are generally  in diameter.

Nutrients, phytochemicals and research 
Raw Brussels sprouts are 86% water, 9% carbohydrates, 3% protein, and negligible fat. In a 100 gram reference amount, they supply high levels (20% or more of the Daily Value, DV) of vitamin C (102% DV) and vitamin K (169% DV), with more moderate amounts of B vitamins, such as vitamin B6, as well as folate; essential minerals and dietary fiber exist in moderate to low amounts (table).

Brussels sprouts, as with broccoli and other brassicas, contain sulforaphane, a phytochemical under basic research for its potential biological properties. Although boiling reduces the level of sulforaphane, steaming, microwave cooking, and stir frying do not cause a significant loss.

Consuming Brussels sprouts in excess may not be suitable for people taking anticoagulants, such as warfarin, since they contain vitamin K, a blood-clotting factor. In one incident, eating too many Brussels sprouts led to hospitalization for an individual on blood-thinning therapy.

Cooking and preparation

The most common method of preparing Brussels sprouts for cooking begins with cutting the buds off the stalk. Any surplus stem is cut away, and any loose surface leaves are peeled and discarded. Once cut and cleaned, the buds are typically cooked by boiling, steaming, stir frying, grilling, slow cooking, or roasting. This process is done for up to 45 minutes and to ensure even cooking throughout, buds of a similar size are usually chosen. Some cooks make a single cut or a cross in the center of the stem to aid the penetration of heat. The cross cut may, however, be ineffective, with it being commonly believed to cause the sprouts to be waterlogged when boiled.

Overcooking renders the buds gray and soft, and they then develop a strong flavor and odor that some dislike for its garlic- or onion-odor properties. The odor is associated with the glucosinolate sinigrin, a sulfur compound having characteristic pungency. For taste, roasting Brussels sprouts is a common way to cook them to enhance flavor. Common toppings or additions include Parmesan cheese and butter, balsamic vinegar, brown sugar, chestnuts, or pepper.

Gallery

References

External links

 Brassica oleracea gemmifera – Plants For a Future database entry

Brassica oleracea
Edible plants
Leaf vegetables
Brussels
Miniature versions of vegetables
Belgian cuisine
Belgian inventions